Theano Fotiou (born 10 May 1946 in Athens) is a Greek architect and politician of the Coalition of the Radical Left (Syriza). From January 2015 to July 2019, she served as Alternate Minister of Social Solidarity in the First and Second Tsipras Cabinets.

Early life and education
Born 1946 in Athens, Fotiou studied architecture at National Technical University of Athens (NTUA) graduating in 1969.

Professional career
Since 1972, she has taught architecture at the NTUA School of Architecture. She has also been a Visiting Professor at the Royal College of Art, The Bartlett, London and Barcelona Architecture School. In 1980 she received a second postgraduate degree in urban planning at Paris X University Nanterre. She is co-founder of the European Design Age Network aiming at design for the elderly.

Major architectural projects
In the 1990s, both the new Technical University of Crete, Chania, and the new Faculty of Humanities at University of Crete, Rethymno was built on her plans. In 2000, she received a 1st prize in the international architectural competition for the 2004 Olympic village. In 2001, she received a 1st honorary mention at the international architectural competition for the Acropolis Museum. In interior design she remodeled the meeting room of the Bank of Greece's head office. Among other works, the new library of the Philosophical Faculty of Athens University has been finished in the last years.

Political career
Since the May 2012 elections, Fotiou has been a Member of the Hellenic Parliament on Syriza's state list. Together with Tasos Kourakis she was nominated for the post of education minister in Syriza's Shadow Cabinet of Alexis Tsipras. After the January 2015 legislative election, Fotiou however was appointed Alternate Minister of Social Solidarity. In the Hellenic Parliament, she currently represents the Athens B constituency.

Publications

References

External links
  
 

1946 births
Architects from Athens
Living people
Aristotle University of Thessaloniki alumni
Academic staff of the Aristotle University of Thessaloniki
Greek women architects
Women members of the Hellenic Parliament
Syriza politicians
Greek MPs 2012 (May)
Greek MPs 2012–2014
Greek MPs 2015 (February–August)
Government ministers of Greece
Academic staff of the National Technical University of Athens
Greek MPs 2015–2019
21st-century Greek women politicians
Women government ministers of Greece
Politicians from Athens
Greek MPs 2019–2023